Karbinci is a village in North Macedonia. It is a seat of the Karbinci municipality.

Demographics
According to the 2002 census, the village had a total of 673 inhabitants. Ethnic groups in the village include:

Macedonians 672
Serbs 1

References

Villages in Karbinci Municipality